The Regional Government of Northwest Russia was a short-lived White counter-revolutionary government formed on 10 November 1918, after the October Revolution.

History
On 10 October 1918, a military force called the Pskov Independent Volunteers Corps of the Northern Army was established in the Pskov-Ostrov-Rēzekne region, which at the time had been occupied by Germany since 24 February 1918. In November, the Regional Government of Northwest Russia was formed. 

The force was later renamed the Northern Corps. After December 1918, following an agreement with Estonia, the army was put under Estonian control. In May 1919, the Northwestern Army was formed by general Nikolai Yudenich, one of the most successful Russian commanders of World War I. In October, under the command of Yudenich, he commanded the assault on Petrograd, capturing Tsarskoye Selo, but was defeated and driven back to Estonia. The government was dissolved and the army interned by the Estonians on 5 December 1919.

References

White movement
Counter-revolutionaries
1918 establishments in Russia
1919 disestablishments in Russia
Provisional governments of the Russian Civil War